Hatchet Warrior is the second solo studio album by American rapper Anybody Killa. It was released on April 8, 2003 through Psychopathic Records. Production was handled by Zug Izland, Fritz the Cat, Monoxide Child and Violent J, with co-producers Eric Koder and Shaggy 2 Dope. It features guest appearances from Insane Clown Posse, Blaze Ya Dead Homie, Esham, Zug Izland, Twiztid and Paris.

The album peaked at number 98 on the Billboard 200, number 42 on the Top R&B/Hip-Hop Albums and number 4 on the Independent Albums in the United States.

Background
Formerly known as Native Funk, Anybody Killa made his first appearance in the Juggalo world on the Dark Lotus song "Drunken Ninja Master" recorded specifically for Twiztid's 2001 compilation album Cryptic Collection Vol. 2. He then went on to have multiple appearances on Blaze Ya Dead Homie's debut album 1 Less G n da Hood, and with the overwhelmingly positive response from the fans, ABK recorded his first album for Psychopatic Records from 2002 through early 2003.

The album went through various name changes before its release date, including Foo Dang and Psychopathic Warrior.

Legacy
In his review for AllMusic, Johnny Loftus wrote: "Lines like 'Shootin' off my arrows like AKs' and broad references to the 'native hydro' -- which may or may not be peyote -- make ABK's act seem gimmicky, not menacing, and certainly don't establish him as a new voice in Native American hip hop".

It was announced that while on 2017 April Fools Foolin' tour with Mr. Y.U.G., Mad V and Jay Villain, Anybody Killa will also be doing a Hatchet Warrior Show with fellow Michigan-based rapper Skitzo, performing the album in its entirety at selected locations.

Track listing

Personnel

Vocalists
James "Anybody Killa" Lowery – vocals
Joseph "Violent J" Bruce – vocals (tracks: 4-8, 11, 14)
Chris "Blaze Ya Dead Homie" Rouleau – vocals (tracks: 4, 9, 13)
Esham Smith – vocals (tracks: 4, 5)
Joseph "Shaggy 2 Dope" Utsler – vocals (tracks: 5, 12, 14)
Paul "Monoxide" Methric – vocals (track 6)
Oscar "Paris" Jackson, Jr. – vocals (track 6)
Syn – vocals (tracks: 6, 11, 14)
James "Jamie Madrox" Spaniolo – vocals (track 7)
Dan Miller – vocals (track 13)
Barry – vocals (track 13)
Ashley "Lil' Pig" Horak – vocals (track 15)

Instrumentalists
Michael "Mike P." Puwal – programming (tracks: 1, 2, 4, 5, 7-10, 12, 15), additional guitar (track 14)
Fritz "The Cat" Van Kosky – programming (tracks: 3, 6, 11, 13, 14)
Violent J – programming (tracks 4)
Syn – additional guitar (track 6)
Lil' Pig – live drums (tracks: 8, 12, 14)
Shaggy 2 Dope – live cuts (track 12)
Zug Izland – programming (track 15)

Production
Mike P – producer (tracks: 1, 2, 4, 5, 7-10, 12, 15)
Fritz the Cat – producer (tracks: 3, 6, 11, 13, 14)
Monoxide – producer (tracks: 3, 6, 13, 14)
Violent J – producer (track 4), co-producer (tracks: 1-3, 5-14)
Zug Izland – producers (track 15)
Eric Koder – co-producer (tracks: 6, 11, 14)
Shaggy 2 Dope – co-producer (track 12)

Technicals
Mike P – engineering & mixing (tracks: 1, 2, 4, 5, 7-10, 12, 15), co-mixing (tracks: 3, 6, 11, 13, 14)
Fritz the Cat – engineering & mixing (tracks: 3, 6, 11, 13, 14)
Monoxide – engineering & mixing (tracks: 3, 6, 13, 14)
Violent J – engineering & mixing (track 4), co-mixing (tracks: 1-3, 5, 6, 9, 11-14)
Zug Izland – engineering & mixing (track 15)
Eric Koder – co-mixing (tracks: 6, 11, 14)
Shaggy 2 Dope – co-mixing (track 12)

Charts

References

External links

2003 albums
Anybody Killa albums
Psychopathic Records albums
Albums produced by Mike Puwal
Albums produced by Joseph Bruce
Gangsta rap albums by American artists